Nikita Vadimovich Novikov  (born 25 July 2003) is a Russian professional ice hockey player for HC Dynamo Moscow of the Kontinental Hockey League (KHL).

Playing career
Novikov was drafted in the sixth round, 188th overall, by the Buffalo Sabres in the 2021 NHL Entry Draft. He made his professional debut for HC Dynamo Moscow during the 2021–22 season.

International play
Novikov represented Russia at the 2021 IIHF World U18 Championships where he recorded five assists in seven games and won a silver medal. He played for Russia at the 2022 World Junior Ice Hockey Championships.

Career statistics

Regular season and playoffs

International

References

External links

2003 births
Living people
Buffalo Sabres draft picks
HC Dynamo Moscow players
Russian ice hockey defencemen
Ice hockey people from Moscow